Rhinopomyzella is a genus of flies in the family Pseudopomyzidae.

Distribution
Jamaica, Ecuador, Brazil

Species
Rhinopomyzella albimanus Hennig, 1969
Rhinopomyzella nigrimana Hennig, 1969

References

Pseudopomyzidae
Brachycera genera
Taxa named by Willi Hennig
Diptera of South America